Palenquero (sometimes spelled Palenkero) or Palenque is a Spanish-based creole language spoken in Colombia. It is believed to be a mixture of Kikongo (a language spoken in central Africa in the current countries of Congo, DRC, Gabon, and Angola, former member states of Kongo) and Spanish. However, there is no sufficient evidence to indicate that Palenquero is strictly the result of a two-language contact. Palenquero is the only surviving Spanish-based creole language in Latin America, if Papiamento (which is often considered to be Portuguese-based) is excluded. Over 6,600 people spoke this language in 2018. It is primarily spoken in the village of San Basilio de Palenque which is southeast of Cartagena, and in some neighbourhoods of Barranquilla.

History

Origin 
The formation of Palenquero is recorded from the 17th century with the dilution of the Spanish language and the increase of maroon activity. There are existing records dating from the era of Cartagena’s slave trade that allude to the pidgin from which Palenquero evolved. As illustrated in the ethnographic text of De Instauranda Aethiopum Salute (1627), the priest Alonso de Sandoval refers to the ‘corruption of our Spanish language’ commonly spoken amongst African slaves. Palenquero's origins are unclear; it does not appear explicitly in print until 1772.

Palenque de San Basilio 
Palenque de San Basilio or San Basilio de Palenque is the village from which Palenquero originated from and in which it is most commonly spoken. The village was formed in the early 17th century on the south of Cartagena by fugitive slaves from surrounding districts under the leadership of Benkos Biohó. The dissolution of the Spanish language thus intensified with the arrival of maroons that escaped slavery and settled in armed fortified territories. Palenqueros maintained their physical distance from others as a form of anti colonial resistance, and as result, developed a creole mostly based on their own African languages and Spanish. Residents have also been noted to be bilingual in both Palenquero and Spanish, with a mention in 1913 of Palenque de San Basilio as having a 'guttural dialect that some believe to be the very African language, if not in all its purity at least with some variations'.

Decline 
For almost two decades, Palenquero has been classified as an endangered language. Although spoken in parallel to each other, Spanish has dominated the linguistic activity of Palenque de San Basilio, with 53% of residents being unable to speak Palenquero.The decline of Palenquero can be traced back to the establishment of sugar and banana plantations with many of its natives leaving the village in order to find work either in the Panama Canal or the Department of Magdalena. and coming into contact with other languages. In the 20th century, with the introduction of a standard Spanish educational system, Palenquero was often criticized and mocked, as Spanish became the supra regional prescriptive speech. Racial discrimination furthered the deterioration of Palenquero as parents did not feel comfortable continuing to teach their children the language.

Revitalization 
A legacy of cultural resistance, Palenquero has managed to remain active since the early 17th century despite the many challenges. In recent years, Palenquero has undergone a significant renovation through 'community activism' and 'educational programs' as an attempt to bring pride to native speakers. Three major events have contributed to the revived interest in the Palenquero creole:

Antonio Cervantes 
Antonio Cervantes, also known as Kid Pambelé, is an internationally recognized boxing champion born in Palenque de San Basilio. After winning the 1972 world Jr. Welterweight championship, a sense of pride for both the village and Palenquero as a language emerged. As result, Palenque de San Basilio became the interest of many journalists and politicians, which consequently brought lots of cultural and foreign attention.

UNESCO Heritage of Humanity 
In 2005, Palenque was declared a Masterpiece of the Oral and Intangible Heritage of Humanity by the United Nations. The recognition led to appreciation for Palenquero culture as films, documentaries and music festivals have brought upon more attention to the community. These type of cultural programs have successfully appealed to Colombian youth, to whom the Palenquero language is mostly lost upon.

Academic Interest 
Beginning in 1992, the educational system in Palenque de San Basilio started reintroducing Palenquero in the curriculum. Children resumed their learning of Palenquero, as it was introduced in preschool and a fully equipped cultural centre was constructed to promote the language and culture. Additionally, academic research, conferences and activism has increased the desirability to learn Palenquero and continue to pass it down generations.

Grammar 
Similar to several other creole languages, Palenquero grammar lacks inflectional morphology, meaning that nouns, adjectives, verbs and determiners are almost always invariant.

Gender 
Grammatical gender is non-existent, and adjectives derived from Spanish default to the masculine form:  ‘African language’.

Plurality 
Plurality is marked with the particle . (for example:  is "houses"). This particle is believed to derive from Kikongo, a Bantu language, and is the sole Kikongo-derived inflection present in Palenquero. The younger speakers of Palenquero utilize  for plurality more so than the speakers that came before them.

This particle is usually dropped with cardinal numbers greater than two:  "two cows" but  "13 years".

Verbs

Copula 

Examples:
    (You are not my mother)
      (My wife is black and I am black)
    (I will be a doctor)
    (That woman is fat)

Vocabulary
Some 300 words of African origin have been identified in Palenquero, with many believed to originate in the Kikongo language. A comprehensive list and proposed etymologies are provided in Moñino and Schwegler's "Palenque, Cartagena y Afro-Caribe: historia y lengua" (2002).  Many of the words that come from African origin, include plant, animal, insect and landscape names. Another handful of words are believed to originate from Portuguese (for example: mai 'mother'; ten 'has'; ele 'he/she'; bae 'go').

Sample

See also

References

External links

 Colombian varieties of Spanish by Richard J. File-Muriel, Rafael Orozco (eds.), (2012)
 Misa andi lengua ri palenque - Katajena, mayo 21 ri 2000

Spanish-based pidgins and creoles
Endangered diaspora languages
Languages of Colombia
Afro-Colombian
Languages of the African diaspora
Barranquilla
Mahates
Languages attested from the 17th century
Spanish language in South America
Creoles of the Americas